The Best of Salt 'n Pepa is a greatest hits album by American hip hop trio Salt-N-Pepa. It was released in November 1999. The album featured tracks from their five studio albums, Hot, Cool & Vicious, A Salt with a Deadly Pepa, Blacks' Magic, Very Necessary and Brand New.
A remixed version of their 1998 song "Gitty Up" was released as a single now titled "The Brick Track Versus Gitty Up" which charted in the top 20 in Australia and New Zealand in 2000.

Review
Steve Huey of AllMusic gave the album 4 out of 5 saying, "The Best of Salt 'n Pepa is an excellent 15-track overview of the groundbreaking female rap group's career, featuring all their big hits from the early days up through their platinum success in the '90s... it's an excellent summary of their career. There are a few alternate mixes included, like the video version of "Whatta Man" and two different versions of "Push It," but there are no glaring omissions or substitutions. It might have been nice if the tracks were ordered chronologically, so that the group's development from cover-happy dance-rappers to sexy crossover hit makers could be traced more readily. But their assertive self-confidence and underlying feminism hold everything together, and the best singles here rank as influential hip-hop classics."

Track listing
 Push It (Again) (DJ Tonka Remix Edit)  - 5:19
 The Brick Track Versus Gitty Up  (Rickidy Raw Hide Radio Mix)  - 3:11
 Whatta Man (feat En Vogue)  (Video Remix)  - 4:28
 Shake Your Thang (It's Your Thing) - 3:57
 Tramp - 3:19
 Let's Talk About Sex - 3:31
 Do You Want Me - 3:18
 Shoop (Original Version) - 4:01
 Expression (Hard ECU Edit) - 4:05
 You Showed Me (The Born Again Mix) - 3:25
 None of Your Business (Perfecto Radio Mix) - 3:22
 R U Ready (E.E.C Radio Edit) - 3:32
 Start Me Up (Radio Edit) - 3:37
 Twist and Shout -  3:48
 Push It (Radio Version) - 3:27

Charts

References

1999 greatest hits albums
London Records albums
Salt-N-Pepa albums